Myja is a genus of small, delicate sea slugs, aeolid nudibranchs, marine gastropod molluscs in the family Facelinidae.

Species
Species within the genus Myja include:

References 

Facelinidae